George D. Schwab (born November 25, 1931) is an American political scientist, editor, Holocaust survivor, and academic. He was the president of the National Committee on American Foreign Policy, an American non-partisan foreign policy think tank.  He co-founded the organization in 1974 and served as its president from 1993 to 2015, and was the editor of its bimonthly journal, American Foreign Policy Interests.

Early life and education 
Schwab was born in Liepāja, Latvia, on November 25, 1931, to Arkady Schwab and Klara Schwab (née Jacobson) of Latvian Jewish ancestry. The family later immigrated to the United States.

He attended the City College of New York, graduating with a B.A. in 1954. He then attended Columbia University, where he earned a M.A. in 1955 and a Ph.D. in 1968.

Career 

Schwab began his teaching career at Columbia in New York City in 1959. From 1960 to 1968, he was at The City College of New York and the Graduate Center, CUNY. From 1968 to 1972 he was an assistant professor of history, an associate professor from 1973 to 1979, and professor from 1980 to 2000, and professor emeritus (City College and the Graduate Center), 2001–present.

In 1974, Schwab was a co-founder of the National Committee on American Foreign Policy with the late Hans J. Morgenthau.  He has edited the committee's bimonthly, American Foreign Policy Interests, since the inception of its publication in 1976.  In 1984 he contributed a chapter titled A Decade of the National Committee on American Foreign Policy to a Festschrift in honor of Hans J. Morgenthau and the National Committee.  Before assuming the presidency of the Committee in 1993, he was its senior vice president and vice president.

Schwab has also lectured widely on his concept of The Open-Society Bloc at, among other institutions, the University of Freiburg in Germany and the Bundeswehrhochschule at Hamburg.  He has also presented papers and actively participated at international gatherings in Tokyo; Paris (the Nobel Laureate conference at the Elysée Palace, 1988); Jerusalem; Washington, D.C.; and New York.

In the fall of 2001 the National Committee received a private endowment designed to honor the work of Professor Schwab which led to the creation of the George D. Schwab Foreign Policy Briefings. Speakers at the briefings range from heads of state, foreign ministers, ambassadors, officials of international organizations, and other foreign policy practitioners and experts. They are held throughout the year to give members and guests the opportunity to extend and enhance their understanding of issues that affect the national interests of the United States.

Schwab retired from teaching in 2000; he is currently professor emeritus of City College and the Graduate Center. He retired from the National Committee in 2016 and now holds the title of president emeritus.

Personal life 
In 1965 he married Eleonora Storch and they had three children, Clarence Boris, Claude Arkady, and Solan Bernhard. Mrs. Schwab died in 1998.

Memberships 

 Council on Foreign Relations
 German Studies Association
 The City University of New York Academy of Humanities and Sciences
 Columbia University's Seminar on the History of Legal and Political Thought and Institutions.  
 United States Holocaust Memorial Museum in Washington, D.C.: Committee on Conscience, Academic Committee, Collections and Acquisitions Committee
 Latvian President's Commission of International Historians
 Vice President of the Telos-Paul Piccone Institute

Awards

 Decorated Order of the Three Stars (Latvia) (2002)
 Ellis Island Medal of Honor (May 1998) 
Elie Wiesel Award (2018) awarded by United States Holocaust Memorial Museum

Publications

 Subject of the 2010 "Prix Europe" (Bancarella Romana) award winning novel by Gwendolyn Chabrier titled Behind the Barbed Wire. It was published in French, English, Italian, and Russian.

Editor

 American Foreign Policy Interests

Translator

 (Carl Schmitt) The Leviathan in the State Theory of Thomas Hobbes, with Erma Hilfstein. Westport, CT and London, 1996 . University of Chicago Press, 2008. Introduction translated into Chinese, 2018.
 (Carl Schmitt) Political Theology: Four Chapters on the Concept of Sovereignty, Cambridge, MA and London, 1985, 1988, Chicago, 2005 . Introduction translated into Chinese, 2018.
 (Carl Schmitt) The Concept of the Political, New Brunswick, NJ and London, 1976, Chicago, 1996 . Introduction translated into Chinese, 2019.

Author

 The National Committee on American Foreign Policy at Thirty-Five, American Foreign Policy Interests, Vol. 31, No. 4, July–August 2009
 Letter to Pope Benedict XIV on the Governorship of East Jerusalem, No Going Back, London, 2009
 Bill Flynn, the National Committee on American Foreign Policy, and the Beginnings of the Northern Ireland Peace Process, Irish America, New York, 2008
 NATO and Transatlantic Security: An Overview, American Foreign Policy Interests, Vol. 30, No. 3, May–June 2008
 US National Security Interests Today, American Foreign Policy Interests, Vol, 25, No. 5, October 2003
 The National Committee on American Foreign Policy's Focus on Russia, The Harriman Economic and Business Review, Vol. I, No. 1, January 2000
 Carl Schmitt, a Note on a Qualitative Authoritarian Bourgeois Liberal, Staat–Souveränität–Verfassung, Berlin, 2000
 Journey to Belfast and London (with William J. Flynn), a National Committee on American Foreign Policy publication, New York, 1999
 Contextualizing Carl Schmitt’s Concept of Grossraum, History of European Ideas, Vol. 19, Nos. 1-3, 1994
 Carl Schmitt Hysteria in the US, Telos, No. 1, Spring 1992; Politische Lageanalyse, Bruchsal, 1993. In Chinese, 2018/
 Thoughts of a Collector, Dayez, Paris 1991
 The Broken Vow, the Good Obtained, United States Holocaust Memorial Museum Newsletter, Washington, D.C., February, 1991
 Elie Wiesel: Between Jerusalem and New York, Elie Wiesel, New York and London, 1990
 The Destruction of a Family, Muted Voices, New York, 1987
 A Decade of the National Committee on American Foreign Policy, Power and Policy in Transition, Westport, CT and London, 1984
 Toward a New Foreign Policy, United States Foreign Policy at the Crossroads, Westport, Ct. 1982 (editor and contributor) 
 Eurocommunism: The Ideological and Political Theoretical Foundations, Westport, CT, 1981 (editor and contributor) 
 From Quantity and Heterogeneity: Toward a New Foreign Policy, Newsletter of the National Committee on American Foreign Policy, August–October, 1980
 State and Nation: Towards a Further Clarification, Nationalism: Essays in Honor of Louis L. Snyder, Michael Palumbo and William O. Shanahan, Westport, CT, 1981
 Schmitt Scholarship, Canadian Journal of Political and Social Theory, Vol. 4, No. 2., 1980; in Chinese 2018.
 United States Foreign Policy at the Crossroads, 1980, 1982 (editor and contributor) 
 American Foreign Politics at the Crossroads, in Innen-und Aussenpolitik. Bern, 1980
 The German State in Historical Perspective, Germany in World Politics by Viola Herms Drath (ed.), New York, 1979
 The Decision: Is the American Sovereign at Bay?, Revue européenne des sciences sociales (Cahiers Vilfredo Pareto), Tome XVI, No. 44, 1978 
 Ideology and Foreign Policy, New York and London, 1978, 1981 (editor and contributor) 
 Legality and Illegality as Instruments of Revolutionaries in their Quest for Power, Interpretation, Vol. 7, No. 1., January 1978
 Appeasement and Détente, Détente in Historical Perspective, 1975, 1981 (editor and contributor)  
 Carl Schmitt: Political Opportunist?, Intellect, Vol. 103, No. 2363, 1975
 The Challenge of the Exception: An Introduction to the Political Ideas of Carl Schmitt, 1970, 2nd ed. 1989. Japanese 1980. Italian 1986. Chinese 2011. 
 Switzerland’s Tactical Nuclear Weapons Policy, Orbis, Vol. XIII, No. 3, 1969
 Enemy oder Foe, Eppirhosis, Berlin, 1968, [Edited English version] Telos, No. 72, 1987. Original published in German; in Japanese in 1980; in Chinese in 2011; in Greek in 2018.
 Dayez: Beyond Abstract Art, Paris, 1967 ISBN B0006BY4GY
 "Carl Schmitt, Through a Glass Darkly, Eclectica, 17.71-72 (1988), 77-82

References 

American foreign policy writers
American male non-fiction writers
1931 births
Living people
Carl Schmitt scholars